Gunga Din is a 1939 American adventure film from RKO Radio Pictures directed by George Stevens and starring Cary Grant, Victor McLaglen, and Douglas Fairbanks Jr., loosely based on the 1890 poem of the same name by Rudyard Kipling combined with elements of his 1888 short story collection Soldiers Three. The film is about three British sergeants and Gunga Din, their native bhisti (water bearer), who fight the Thuggee, an Indian murder cult, in colonial British India.

The supporting cast features Joan Fontaine, Eduardo Ciannelli, and in the title role, Sam Jaffe.  The epic film was written by Joel Sayre and Fred Guiol from a storyline by Ben Hecht and Charles MacArthur, with uncredited contributions by Lester Cohen, John Colton, William Faulkner, Vincent Lawrence, Dudley Nichols, and Anthony Veiller.

In 1999, Gunga Din was deemed "culturally, historically, or aesthetically significant" by the United States Library of Congress and selected for preservation in the National Film Registry.

Plot
On the Northwest Frontier of India, circa 1880, contact has been lost with a British outpost at Tantrapur in the midst of a telegraph message. Colonel Weed dispatches a detachment of 25 British Indian Army troops to investigate, led by three sergeants of the Royal Engineers: MacChesney, Cutter, and Ballantine, long-time friends and veteran campaigners. Although they are a disciplinary headache for their colonel, they are the right men to send on a dangerous mission. Accompanying the detail are six Indian camp workers, including regimental bhisti (water carrier) Gunga Din, who longs to throw off his lowly status and become a soldier of the Queen.

They find Tantrapur apparently deserted and set about repairing the telegraph. However, they are soon surrounded by hostile locals. The troops fight their way out, taking heavy losses. Colonel Weed and Major Mitchell identify an enemy weapon brought back by the survivors as belonging to the Thuggee, a murder cult that had been suppressed 50 years previously. Weed intends to send MacChesney and Cutter back with a larger force, in order to retake the town and complete the telegraph repairs. Ballantine, however, is due to muster out of the army in a few days; Weed orders Sgt. Higginbotham, disliked by both MacChesney and Cutter, to join the expedition as Ballantine's replacement.

Once he is discharged, Ballantine plans to wed Emmy Stebbins and go into the tea business, a combined calamity that MacChesney and Cutter consider worse than death. MacChesney and Cutter are invited to the engagement party; intending to cause mischief, they spike the punch, which is subsequently drunk by Higginbotham. Higginbotham is so sick the following morning that he is unable to march out with the expedition, so a reluctant Ballantine is ordered to replace him.

At Tantrapur, Ballantine is eager to complete as much of the repairs as possible before his enlistment ends, while Cutter and MacChesney are frustrated and bored by the lack of action. Both suspect that if he could see some combat, Ballantine would change his mind about leaving the army. Ballantine's enlistment ends while the detachment is still at Tantrapur, and a relief column led by Higginbotham, with Emmy riding along to surprise Ballantine, arrives. Meanwhile, Gunga Din tells Cutter of a temple he has found, one made of gold. Cutter is determined to make his fortune, but MacChesney will have none of it and has Cutter put in the stockade to prevent his desertion. That night, Cutter escapes with Din's help and goes to the temple, which they discover belongs to the Thugs when the cultists return for a ceremony. Cutter creates a distraction and allows himself to be captured so that Din can slip away and sound the warning.

When Din gives MacChesney the news, he decides to go to the rescue, while Higginbotham sends word to headquarters to call out the entire regiment. Ballantine wants to go, too, but MacChesney points out that he cannot, as he is now a civilian. Ballantine reluctantly agrees to re-enlist, on the understanding that the enlistment paper will be torn up after the rescue. Emmy tries to dissuade him from going, but he refuses to desert his friends. MacChesney's eagerness leads him to head to the temple without questioning Din in detail. As a result, MacChesney, Ballantine, and Din foolishly enter the temple by themselves and are easily captured. They are thrown into a cell with Cutter, where they discover he has been tortured since his capture; the guru demands that they reveal the details of their regiment's location. MacChesney tricks the Thuggee guru into thinking he is prepared to betray his friends and the British army, and the soldiers use the opportunity to take the guru hostage. A standoff ensues, and the soldiers take the guru to the roof of the temple, where they discover the true size of the Thuggee forces.

As the regiment marches toward the temple, the guru boasts that they are falling into the trap he has set. He orders his men, still clustered around the temple, to take their positions, but they refuse to abandon him. When he sees that they are unwilling to leave him in enemy hands, he commits suicide to remove that obstacle; the Thuggee force moves into position, while other cultists swarm up the temple in order to kill the sergeants. Thugs shoot and bayonet Cutter. Gunga Din is also bayoneted, but manages with the last of his strength to climb to the top of the gold dome of the temple and sound the alarm with a bugle taken from a dead Thug. He is then shot dead, but the British force is alerted and defeats the Thuggee forces. At Din's funeral pyre, the colonel formally inducts Gunga Din as a British corporal—then  he asks visiting journalist Rudyard Kipling to hand him the draft of the poem Kipling has just completed, so that he might read the final words himself over Din's body. Ballantine announces his intention to remain in the army, and instead of tearing up his re-enlistment papers, gives them to the colonel, much to the approval of MacChesney and Cutter. The film ends with a final image of Gunga Din's spirit, standing proudly and saluting at attention, now in British uniform.

Cast

 Cary Grant as Sgt. Archibald Cutter
 Victor McLaglen as Sgt. 'Mac' MacChesney
 Douglas Fairbanks Jr. as Sgt. Thomas 'Tommy' Ballantine
 Sam Jaffe as Gunga Din
 Eduardo Ciannelli as Guru
 Joan Fontaine as Emaline 'Emmy' Stebbins
 Montagu Love as Col. Weed
 Robert Coote as Sgt. Bertie Higginbotham
 Abner Biberman as Chota
 Lumsden Hare as Maj. Mitchell
 Cecil Kellaway as Mr. Stebbins (uncredited)
 Reginald Sheffield as Rudyard Kipling (uncredited)
 George Regas as Thug Chieftain "Toadface" (uncredited)
 Roland Varno as Lt. Markham (uncredited)

Production

Development

The rights to Kipling's poem were bought by producer Edward Small's Reliance Pictures in 1936 in exchange for £4,700. RKO took the rights as part of a production deal with Small when he moved to the company. William Faulkner did some preliminary script work then the project was assigned to Howard Hawks. He got Ben Hecht and Charles MacArthur to write the screenplay and the film was set to start in 1937 but was delayed to find suitable cast. Hawks was fired from the project following the commercial failure of Bringing Up Baby and George Stevens was assigned to direct.

Originally, Grant and Fairbanks were assigned each other's role; Grant was to be the one leaving the army to marry Joan Fontaine's character, and Fairbanks the happy-go-lucky treasure hunter, since the character was identical to the legendary screen persona of Fairbanks' father.

According to Robert Osborne of Turner Classic Movies, when Grant wanted to switch parts, director George Stevens suggested they toss a coin; Grant won and Fairbanks Jr. lost his most important role.

On the other hand, according to a biography of director George Stevens by Marilyn Ann Moss entitled Giant: George Stevens, a Life on Film, the Cutter role was originally slated for comedy actor Jack Oakie until Grant requested the part because it would enable him to inject more humor into his performance, at which point Fairbanks, Jr. was brought on board to replace Grant as Ballantine.

On a more recent showing of the film on TCM, Ben Mankiewicz has contradicted the story told about the coin-flip by his colleague Osbourne, and has stated that while Grant was originally slated to play Sergeant Ballantine, and did indeed decide to switch to the more comedic role of Sergeant Cutter, he claimed that after taking over the role that may or may not have already been filled, Grant actually recommended that his former role go to his friend Douglas Fairbanks Jr. and was primarily responsible for him gaining the part.

Fairbanks Jr. claims he was cast as Cutter by Howard Hawks then asked to change.

Filming

Filming began on June 24, 1938 and was completed on October 19, 1938. The film premiered in Los Angeles on January 24, 1939. California's Sierra Nevada range, Alabama Hills and surrounding areas doubled as the Khyber Pass for the film.

Douglas Fairbanks, Jr. reported in a featurette interview on the DVD release that in his travels, he has met several Hindi Indians who were convinced the external scenes were filmed on location in Northwest India at the actual Khyber Pass.  A few interiors were made on sets at RKO Radio Pictures Hollywood sound stages, and one exterior scene filmed on the RKO Encino movie ranch.  The original script was composed largely of interiors and detailed life in the barracks. The decision was made to make the story a much larger adventure tale, but the re-write process dragged on into principal shooting. Some of the incidental scenes that flesh out the story were filmed while hundreds of extras were in the background being marshaled for larger takes.

The movie includes a sequence at the end in which a fictionalized Rudyard Kipling, played by Reginald Sheffield, witnesses the events and is inspired to write his poem (the scene in which the poem is first read out carefully quotes only those parts of the poem that tally with the events of the movie). Following objections from Kipling's family, the character was excised from some prints of the movie, but has since been restored.

Reception

Box office
The film earned $1,888,000 in the United States and Canada and $919,000 elsewhere, but because of its high production cost, it recorded a loss of $193,000.  The film was the sixth highest grossing film nationally in 1939; however, in the ten states of Indiana, Ohio, Nebraska, Montana, Idaho, Utah, Pennsylvania, Alabama, Mississippi, and South Carolina, it was the third highest grossing film, coming only behind Gone with the Wind (which came in first place nationally, as well as in each of these states individually) and The Wizard of Oz (which came in fifth place nationally and second place in the aforementioned ten states).

Critical
Time gave Gunga Din a positive review. However, they also noted that the film was part of a recent Hollywood trend of manufactured screwball comedies, re-releases, remakes, and thinly disguised remakes; comparing Gunga Din to several previous films such as Lives of a Bengal Lancer, Charge of the Light Brigade, and Drums.

Bertolt Brecht discusses the film in his short essay "Is it worth speaking about the amateur theater?" Here Brecht reflects that "Despite the fact that I knew all the time that there was something wrong, that the Indians are not primitive and uncultured people but have a magnificent age-old culture, and that this Gunga Din could also be seen in a different light, e.g. as a traitor to his people, I was amused and touched because this utterly distorted account was an artistic success and considerable resources in talent and ingenuity had been applied in making it.
Obviously artistic appreciation of this sort is not without effects. It weakens the good instincts and strengthens the bad, it contradicts true experience and spreads misconceptions, in short it perverts our picture of the world."

Douglas Fairbanks Jr. called the film "my sole masterpiece among the hundred or so films I made."

After criticism from the Indian press (notably the Bombay Chronicle and Filmindia), the film was banned in Bengal and Bombay, then later in Japan because it "injures the sentiments of a friendly nation"

Awards
Cinematographer Joseph H. August was nominated for an Academy Award for Best Cinematography, Black-and-White.

In 1999, the film was deemed "culturally significant" by the United States Library of Congress and selected for preservation in the National Film Registry.

American Film Institute List
 AFI's 100 Years...100 Cheers – #74

Influence
Gunga Din was one of novelist and screenwriter William Goldman's favorite films. His first novel, The Temple of Gold, is named after the location of the film's climax, and the movie is mentioned by name in the introduction to Goldman's novel The Princess Bride.

The film was remade in 1962 as Sergeants 3 by members of the Rat Pack (Frank Sinatra, Dean Martin, Sammy Davis Jr, Peter Lawford and Joey Bishop); the part of Gunga Din was played by Sammy Davis Jr. while Sinatra portrayed a variation of the Victor McLaglen role and Dean Martin played Cary Grant's part.

Several later films have paid homage to scenes from Gunga Din. In Help! (1965) the Beatles are pursued by a thuggee like cult, and in The Party (1968) Peter Sellers plays an actor starring in "Son of Gunga Din" and parodies the Bugle scene.

In the 1984 film Indiana Jones and the Temple of Doom (set in India in 1935), many of the events and scenes are taken directly from Gunga Din, including scenes involving the Thugee cult and its leader (cast with a look-alike) and the bridge sequence.

Rian Johnson, the director of the 2017 film Star Wars: The Last Jedi, listed Gunga Din as one of the six movies for the cast and crew to watch before starting production.

See also
 List of American films of 1939
 Sergeants 3

References

External links
 
 
 
 
 Gunga Din essay by Daniel Eagan in America's Film Legacy: The Authoritative Guide to the Landmark Movies in the National Film Registry, A&C Black, 2010 , pages 280-282 

1930s war adventure films
1939 films
Films set in 1880
1930s ghost films
American black-and-white films
Films based on poems
Films based on works by Rudyard Kipling
Films directed by George Stevens
RKO Pictures films
United States National Film Registry films
British Empire war films
Films set in the British Raj
American ghost films
Films shot in California
Films scored by Alfred Newman
Films with screenplays by William Faulkner
Films based on multiple works
Films about cults
American war adventure films
American epic films
1930s English-language films
1930s American films
Films about the British Army